The Glendoe Hydro Scheme for the generation of hydro-electric power is located near Fort Augustus, above Loch Ness in the Highlands of Scotland.

The scheme is operated by Scottish and Southern Energy (SSE) and was opened on 29 June 2009 by Queen Elizabeth, accompanied by the Duke of Edinburgh.

Scheme details
Glendoe's 600 m head (the drop from the reservoir to the turbine) is the highest of any hydro electric scheme in the United Kingdom, and is thus ideally suited to generating large amounts of energy from the stored water in the reservoir, especially when combined with the relatively high annual rainfall in the area of around 2,000 mm. The Andritz six-jet vertical axis Pelton turbine at Glendoe  is capable of generating up to 100 MW, with a peak flow of 18.6m³/s.

It is the largest of Scotland's recent civil engineering projects, with Hochtief as the design and build contractor. The scheme is predicted to produce about 180 GWh of electricity per year, enough to provide approximately 5% of the electricity consumption of the city of Glasgow. This gives an overall load factor of approximately 20%.

The immediate catchment of 15 km2 is supplemented by a further 60 km2 connected to the scheme by an underground network of pipes and tunnels, and this is fed into the reservoir on the upper reaches of the River Tarff. The dam, a 905-metre-long concrete-faced rock-filled embankment reaching a height of 35 metres above the valley floor, is hidden from view from all current houses and public roads in the area.

The scheme includes a number of tunnels. An 8.6 km tunnel brings water from diversion intakes to the reservoir. An 8 km long 5m diameter tunnel carries the water to the turbine and out into Loch Ness. This was excavated by a 220m long tunnel boring machine (TBM), that was named "Eliza Jane" after a competition for local schoolchildren. Finally, an access tunnel of 1.3 km in length services the turbine and power station cavern, from the B862 above Fort Augustus.

The power station itself, 2 km from Loch Ness and containing the turbine and generator units, is housed in a large cavern a quarter of a kilometre below the hillside, adjacent to a smaller cavern containing the main transformer.

Station shutdown
In August 2009 the station was shut down and the power tunnel drained because of internal rock falls near the head of the tunnel. Although the equipment in the power station was not affected, Glendoe was unable to generate power until repairs were made.  SSE reported that electricity generation was unlikely to proceed until well into 2012. The repairs involved construction of a bypass tunnel and a downstream access tunnel.  The contract for the repair work was awarded to BAM Nuttall. SSE issued proceedings seeking to recover £130 million in repair and reinstatement costs and £65 million in alleged loss of profit from Hochtief, who constructed the original tunnel, but in a Judgment (Opinion) published in December 2016 Hochtief was held by the Scottish Court of Session not to have been liable for the collapse. In an appeal decided in 2018, SSE were awarded more than £107 million in compensation.  The judges hearing the appeal split 2–1 in SSE's favour.

Energy generation at the scheme restarted in August 2012.

References

External links

SSE Glendoe website

Hydroelectric power stations in Scotland
Buildings and structures in Highland (council area)